Horodnytsia is an inhabited locality in Ukraine and it may stand for:

Urban-type settlement
 Horodnytsia in Zhytomyr Oblast, Zviahel Raion

Villages
 Horodnytsia in Uman Raion, Cherkasy Oblast;
 Horodnytsia in Kolomyia Raion, Ivano-Frankivsk Oblast;
 Horodnytsia in Chortkiv Raion, Ternopil Oblast;
 Horodnytsia in Ternopil Raion, Ternopil Oblast;
 Horodnytsia in Nemyriv Raion, Vinnytsia Oblast.